Axinellidae is a family of sponges in the order Axinellida.

This family includes some photo-synthetic sponges that occur throughout the world's coral reefs. They are amongst the more common sponges seen in the aquarium trade but are usually not successful species in captivity and not ones that thrive in the small household tank environment. They are common throughout the Indian Ocean and the Pacific Ocean coral reefs. Species which derive their nutrition from sunlight must stay fairly close to the surface in order for their zooxanthellae to synthesize light into the sugars these sponges use to survive.

Genera
There are ten genera:
 Axinella Schmidt, 1862
 Cymbastela Hooper & Bergquist, 1992
 Dragmacidon Hallmann, 1917
 Dragmaxia Hallmann, 1916
 Ophiraphidites Carter, 1876
 Pararhaphoxya Burton, 1934
 Phycopsis Carter, 1883
 Pipestela Alvarez, Hooper & van Soest, 2008
 Ptilocaulis Carter, 1883
 Reniochalina Lendenfeld, 1888

References

Heteroscleromorpha
 
Sponge families
Taxa named by Henry John Carter